Amburla Station is a pastoral lease that operates as a cattle station in Northern Territory, Australia.

The most productive area of the property are the Mitchell grass plains at the foot of Mount Hay and the relict alluvial plains of the floodout areas of Amburla, Charley and 16 mile Creeks. The sandy red earth of the floodouts support mulga woodlands. The northern part of the property is composed of sandplains supporting spinifex.

Gary Dann, father of television actor Troy Dann, owned the property in 1989. The Danns sold the property in 2007 to Sterling Buntine. Sterling Buntine sold the station in 2011 for 6 million, it was sold to local cattleman Tony Davies.

See also
List of ranches and stations

References

Pastoral leases in the Northern Territory
Stations (Australian agriculture)